Jeong Jun-yeon (born 30 April 1989) is a South Korean footballer who plays as a defender for FC Anyang.

Club career statistics

External links

1989 births
Living people
Sportspeople from South Jeolla Province
Association football defenders
South Korean footballers
South Korea under-20 international footballers
Jeonnam Dragons players
Gwangju FC players
Gimcheon Sangmu FC players
K League 1 players
K League 2 players